Justin Lee Brannan (born October 14, 1978) is an American politician and musician. A Democrat, he is the current New York City Councilmember for the 43rd district, based in Bay Ridge, Brooklyn. A former musician, he was a founding member of the New York City hardcore bands Indecision and Most Precious Blood.

Personal life
Brannan is an outspoken vegetarian and animal welfare advocate. A Third Degree Master Freemason, Brannan founded the Bay Ridge Democrats, an active Democratic political club based in southwest Brooklyn. In 2012 he was named one of the "New York City Rising Stars: 40 Under 40" by City & State newspaper for his work as Director of Communications and Legislative Affairs for New York City Councilman Vincent Gentile.

Brannan is married to artist and educator Leigh Jewel Holliday. The couple were married in the lobby of Bear Stearns where they met as employees. Brannan and Holliday opened a fine art school for children in Bay Ridge called The Art Room.

Brannan attended Xaverian High School in Bay Ridge, Brooklyn. He studied journalism and mass media at Fordham University and College of Staten Island. He has worked for Bank of New York and Bankers Trust. He later worked as a commercial announcer for WNEW-FM, where he was the de facto shop steward for the American Federation of Television and Radio Artists. While at WNEW, Brannan represented and defended the interests of his fellow employees and advocated to get all union employees retroactively paid for decades of overtime work on weekends and overnights.

Career

Music career
Before entering politics, Justin Brannan was a hardcore punk guitarist for the bands Indecision from 1993 to 2000 and Most Precious Blood from 2000 onwards. Both bands were known for their outspoken commitment to social justice and vegetarianism. The band’s messages focused on social justice, human rights, environmentalism, relationships, individuality and espousing straight-edge views against drugs, alcohol and promiscuous sex.

Indecision is widely known for their song "Hallowed be Thy Name". The song features a lyric ("For Those I Love I Will Sacrifice") wrote by Brannan when he was sixteen years old that fans across the world have turned into a tattoo. Most famously, an image of the tattoo was seen on the ribs of a 19-year-old US Army infantryman named Kyle Hockenberry being treated in a medevac helicopter following an explosion that cost him both of his legs and one arm. The photo was taken for a military newspaper and won photographer Laura Rauch an award from the Society of Professional Journalists. Brannan also works closely with the 9/11 Stephen Siller Tunnel to Towers Foundation commemorating the heroes of 9/11 and "Building for America’s Bravest", a program that constructs Smart Homes for military returning home with devastating injuries.

Brannan also founded the deathgrind band Caninus, known for using two dogs as vocalists.

Finance career
Brannan was a touring punk rock musician before he landed at Bear Stearns, working his way up as a clerk in their wealth management division, and working as a financier in the venture capital space raising money for start-up alternative energy companies based in Silicon Valley. He later worked as a fundraising consultant for a number of non-profit humanitarian organizations in New York City.

Political career
Brannan served as the Director of Communications and Legislative Affairs for Council member Vincent J. Gentile, representing the 43rd district which includes Bay Ridge, Bath Beach, Dyker Heights and portions of Bensonhurst.

City Council
In 2017, Brannan won the Democratic primary to replace Gentile in the 43rd district. Brannan won 39% of the vote in a five-way race, narrowly beating Khader El-Yateem, who garnered 31% of the vote, by 682 votes.

Brannan drew criticism during the campaign for taking money from real estate interests. Contributors to Brannan's campaign include Sal Raziano of the real estate firm Casandra Properties, James Vavas of Vavas Insurance and Financial Services, and Anthony Constantinople of Constantinople & Vallone, a lobbying firm currently under investigation for conflicts of interest and payroll discrepancies surrounding its Sports & Arts program at a Lower East Side public school.

During the campaign, several concerned citizens filed a complaint with the New York City Campaign Finance Board in which they accused Brannan of neglecting to disclose campaign expenses when he failed to alert election regulators that Gentile’s campaign for Brooklyn DA paid the rent for Brannan’s campaign office.

In the general election, Brannan won with 51% of the vote to the Republican candidate, John Quaglione's 47%. Brannan won by a slightly smaller margin in the 2021 election.

References

1978 births
Living people
American lyricists
American punk rock guitarists
College of Staten Island alumni
Xaverian High School alumni
People from Bay Ridge, Brooklyn
New York (state) Democrats
21st-century American politicians
20th-century American musicians
21st-century American musicians
Hardcore punk musicians
American male guitarists
Musicians from Brooklyn
Guitarists from New York City
Politicians from Brooklyn
New York City Council members
20th-century American male musicians
21st-century American male musicians